Edi Mūe Gathegi (born March 10, 1979) is a Kenyan-American actor. He appeared as recurring character Dr. Jeffrey Cole (aka "Big Love") in the television series House, as Cheese in the 2007 film Gone Baby Gone, Laurent in the films Twilight and its sequel The Twilight Saga: New Moon, and as Darwin in X-Men: First Class. Edi also featured in the AMC series, Into the Badlands, as Baron Jacobee. He has also been a recurring character in NBC's television series, The Blacklist, as Matias Solomon, an operative for a covert organization. Gathegi reprised the role in the 2016–2017 season crime thriller, The Blacklist: Redemption. He has also played a leading role in Startup, a television drama series on Crackle. Since 2022, Edi has played engineer and entrepreneur Dev Ayesa in the Apple TV+ original science fiction space drama series For All Mankind.

Early life
Born March 10, 1979, in Nairobi, Kenya, Gathegi grew up in Albany, California, U.S. Gathegi attended the University of California, Santa Barbara, where he played basketball until a knee injury ended his career. Gathegi then began taking acting classes. He then studied at New York University's Graduate Acting Program at the Tisch School of the Arts, graduating in 2005. Gathegi's career began in theatre, and his stage credits include Two Trains Running at the Old Globe Theatre, As You Like It, Twelfth Night, Othello, A Midsummer Night's Dream, and Cyrano de Bergerac, among others.

Career
Gathegi's first professional role was the Haitian Cabbie in the 2006 film, Crank. Though he had originally auditioned for the role of Kaylo, the producers gave the role to Efren Ramirez and instead offered Gathegi an appearance as the Haitian Cabbie. He was skeptical at first about performing a Haitian accent, but was coached by a Haitian friend. In 2007, after guest-starring on Lincoln Heights and Veronica Mars, Gathegi went on to star as Bodie in Death Sentence, Darudi in The Fifth Patient and Cheese in Gone Baby Gone. He later had a recurring role as Mormon intern Dr. Jeffrey Cole in the television medical drama House. His character was often mocked for his religious beliefs by Dr. House, who himself is an atheist. He also guest-starred in CSI: Miami, CSI: Crime Scene Investigation and Life on Mars in 2008 before being cast as Laurent in Twilight. When Gathegi first auditioned for the 2008 film, adapted from the same-titled first book in Stephenie Meyer's Twilight series, he had not heard of the series and was not aware that his character was a vampire. He now has read the whole series and calls himself a hardcore fan.
He portrays Eddie Willers in Atlas Shrugged (2011), based on Ayn Rand's novel of the same name. He later portrayed another Haitian character, Jean Baptiste, in the fifth season of Justified, but was unhappy with the role and asked to be written off the show. He has also been a recurring character in NBC's television series, The Blacklist, as Matias Solomon, an operative for a covert organization. Gathegi reprised the role in the 2016–2017 season crime thriller, The Blacklist: Redemption. He also portrays the character Ronald Dacey on StartUp.

Personal life
Gathegi married Romanian Adriana Marinescu in 2018.

Filmography

Awards and nominations
Drama Desk Awards
2018: Won along with Sean Carvajal for last-minute entrances into the Signature production of this powerful play ensured it had a happy real-life ending" after replacing Reg E. Cathey in late September for a October 5 first preview
Obie Awards
2018: Won OBIE Award for his performance as Lucius Jenkins in Signature Theater Company revival of Jesus Hopped the 'A' Train 
Los Angeles Drama Critics Circle Awards
2011: Won LADCC Award for best Lead Actor in a Play for the role of Franco Wicks in the Geffen Playhouse production of "Superior Donuts"
Method Fest Independent Film Festival
2019: Won Breakout Acting Award for his method performance as Beau Willis in "Princess of the Row"
Ovation Awards
2011: Nominated for Featured Actor in a Play for the role of Franco Wicks in the Geffen Playhouse production of "Superior Donuts"
Lucille Lortel Awards
2018: Nominated for Outstanding Featured Actor in a Play for his role in Jesus Hopped the 'A' Train at Signature Theatre Company

References

External links

1979 births
Living people
People from Nairobi
Kenyan emigrants to the United States
American male film actors
American male stage actors
American male television actors
Kenyan male film actors
Tisch School of the Arts alumni
People from Albany, California
University of California, Santa Barbara alumni
21st-century American male actors
Kenyan male television actors
Kenyan male stage actors
21st-century Kenyan male actors